Shakoor Lake is a lake, comprising 300 km2, located on the border between the Indian state of Gujarat and the Sindh province on the southern edge of Pakistan. About 90 km2 of the lake comes under Pakistan, whilst the majority of the lake i.e. 210  km2, lies within India. The Indian built Indo-Pak Border Road runs across the Shakoor Lake and it is joined by the Indian GJ SH 45 State Highway just east of the lake, at the Kanjarkot Fort.

During the 2010 Pakistan floods, a controversial decision was made by Provincial Minister of Sindh, Zulfiqar Mirza, to release saline water and effluent into Shakoor Lake to alleviate pressure on the Left Bank Outfall Drain (LBOD) in Badin, Pakistan.

Origin

This lake is formed by the emergence of Allah Bund on its southern side by blocking the Nara river (also known as Puran river or Kori river) when a massive earth quake struck the area in 1819. During the river flooding, Shakoor lake surpluses into the Kori Creek through the gaps formed in Allah Bund. Geographically and environmentally, Lake Shakoor is part of the cross-border Rann of Kutch, a large seasonal salt marsh and a Global 200 Ecoregion.

Environmental concerns 
The way water retention and salt extraction has been practised in the Rann of Kutch region, is causing, and has already caused, devastating effects on the local environment; reducing the natural wild life population, drying up and deforesting jungle habitats and mangroves, and threatening the entire regional ecosystem. In Lake Shakoor, salt extraction has been seen as the main culprit in this regard.

Border disputes 
The Shakoor Lake area became involved in the century long "Kutch Dispute" in the 1960s, when Pakistani forces entered the area with a tank division and fortified the Kanjar Kot Fort. The Kutch Dispute then became part of the long-running and continuing border disputes between India and Pakistan, but it originated in the 1910s between the Bombay Presidency and the Princely State of Cutch, thus predating the creation of India and Pakistan. The borders in the Kutch Region was finally settled and effectuated on February 19, 1968, when both sides accepted the award of the Indo-Pakistan Western Boundary Case Tribunal designated by the UN secretary general. Sir Creek in the southwest of Great Rann of Kutch is still disputed though.

See also
 1819 Rann of Kutch earthquake
 Chotiari Dam

References

Sources and external links 
 Ecoregions of Pakistan WWF
 "The looming disaster"
 Google Maps  for the lake

Lakes of Gujarat
Lakes of Sindh
Kutch district